Mirosław Piotr Copija (born 1 August 1965), is a Polish former ice hockey player. He played for Podhale Nowy Targ, SMS Warszawa, and GKS Tychy during his career. He also played for the Polish national team at the 1988 Winter Olympics and 1989 World Championship, and several lower division tournaments. With Podhale he won the Polish league championship five years in a row, from 1993 to 1997.

References

External links
 

1965 births
Living people
GKS Tychy (ice hockey) players
Ice hockey players at the 1988 Winter Olympics
Olympic ice hockey players of Poland
Podhale Nowy Targ players
Polish ice hockey centres
SMS Warszawa players
Sportspeople from Bielsko-Biała